Kosmas is a mountain village and a former community in Arcadia, Peloponnese, Greece. It is considered a traditional settlement. Since the 2011 local government reform it is part of the municipality South Kynouria, of which it is a municipal unit. The municipal unit has an area of 85.220 km2. In 2011 its population was 362. Kosmas is situated in the southeastern part of the Parnon mountains, at about 1150 m elevation, on the road from Skala (Laconia) to Leonidio. It is 13 km southwest of Leonidio, 28 km east of Sparti, 28 km northeast of Skala, 35 km south of Argos and 57 km southeast of Tripoli. Kosmas has a school, a church and a library.

Population

History
In the area which is now known as Kosmas was the ancient city of Selinous, which had a temple of Apollo. Kosmas was first mentioned in 1592 in a letter of Gennadios, metropolitan of Monemvasia. Many inhabitants of Kosmas participated in the Greek War of Independence. The village suffered destruction during World War II and the Greek Civil War (1946-1949).

See also
List of settlements in Arcadia
List of traditional settlements of Greece

External links

References

Populated places in Arcadia, Peloponnese